Dmitry Yuryevich Puchkov (born August 2, 1961), also known as Goblin, is a Russian media personality most known for his humorous English-to-Russian film and video game translations as well as his Oper.ru web blog and, from 2008 until 2022, his eponymous YouTube channel. Puchkov considers himself a Neo-Sovietist and, on several occasions, has demonstrated both public and personal support for the politics of Vladimir Putin coninciding with pro-Kremlin narratives. For that he has been called a "Kremlin pundit" and a "warhawk" by the free media ever since Russia invaded Ukraine, both terms he vehemently denies.

Although initially studying to become an electrical engineer, Puchkov served in the Soviet army then, as the USSR collapsed, made a personal hobby of pirate translating famous Hollywood films into Russian. His alternative voice-over translations thereof are widely known both for their perceived profanity and humour. Puchkov's later career also included screenplay and comic book writing.

Puchkov helped to establish communities to spread memes and Russian influence campaigns on Tynu40k Goblina which spread Pro-Soviet and Russian victory in WWII memes. Puchkov had three million subscribers on YouTube before being removed for violating community guidelines  when spreading pro-Putin propaganda for which Deputy Chairman of the Russian Security Council Dmitry Medvedev demanded revenge

Early career
Puchkov was born on August 2, 1961, in Kirovograd (present-day Kropyvnytskyi), Ukrainian SSR, Soviet Union. His mother is Ukrainian and his father is a Russian of German descent. Puchkov was known by the nickname Goblin or Starshiy operupolnomochenniy Goblin (Senior Operative Agent Goblin) years before he became popular as a film translator. At the time of his earliest public works, he worked as a police investigator for the Militsiya. Because of a newspaper article entitled "Goblins in Militsiya Overcoats" that rebuked the corruption of the Militsiya staff, Puchkov and his workmates began to call each other "goblins" ironically.

Puchkov started using the pen name Goblin while sharing his experience in PC gaming-oriented magazines when writing about the video game Quake. He started a personal website called Goblin's Dead End (Tynu40k Goblina), which focused on Quake. Puchkov became a popular commentator among the Quake community, but he remained virtually unknown otherwise.

His book Dungeon Cleaners (Санитары подземелий) was published in 1999 and quickly sold out, becoming an Internet bestseller. Loosely based on the game concept, the book later became the basis for the 2006 tactical role-playing video game  and its 2008 sequel developed by 1C using Skyfallen Entertainment's TheEngine.

Political activism and propaganda

After Russia's invasion of Ukraine in 2022 Puchkov was interviewed by radio "Комсомольская Правда", where he explained that the reason of Russia's invasion was the actions of the United States. He claimed that the Security Service of Ukraine is controlled completely by the CIA or that western media would deceive a hundred times more than soviet media did.

In March 2022, Puchkov supported Russia's military aggression against Ukraine. He repeatedly transmitted the main theses of Russian propaganda. Hence, according to some EU officials, Puchkov is responsible for supporting Russian aggressive policy that threatens Ukraine's sovereignty and independence.

Sanctions

In December 2022, he was included in the EU sanctions lists (9th sanctions package for Russia's invasion of Ukraine). The European Union representatives noted that in 2014, Puchkov published a book "Ukraine is Russia", in which he implied that Ukraine is not an independent state thus reproducing the ideas of Russian propaganda.

Film translations
Puchkov studied English at the Militsya House of Culture for two years, but is otherwise self-taught as a translator. His first film translation was completed during the perestroika period, when Western productions were first introduced to Soviet viewers.

At that time I already had certain knowledge in English. The quantity of untranslated phrases and obvious bloopers irritated me from the very beginning. And at that time I already wanted to make translation thoroughly, in other words do it the way a good film deserves.

The first films he translated were Carlito's Way in 1995, and shortly after Aliens, Once Upon a Time in the West, Full Metal Jacket, The Thing and Last Action Hero. All of these translations were made for a small circle of friends and were never publicly released, but since the process of dubbing by means of the videocassette recorder was not complicated, the translations became widely known and distributed.

The development of the DVD format revived Puchkov's interest in translating films, and his works became known to a larger public audience. Translated tracks of the films could be downloaded at no charge as MP3 files (includes only voice of Goblin, without original sound of the film) from Puchkov's website. He named his studio Polny P (Полный Пэ, Пэ in this context stands for the curse word пиздец, the phrase roughly translates to "complete fuck-up") and designed a logo, which, being stamped on every translation DVD, CD or video cassette, became a recognizable label.

Puchkov is known as a strong advocate of quality translation, and opposes the practice of literal interpretation of films, which has become commonplace in Russia. His position is that precise translation backed by thorough research and identification of Russian equivalents in cases of lexical gaps should be the product provided to Russian aficionados of foreign films. Puchkov maintains lists of gaffes made by other film translators.

"Alternative approach"
In contrast to the films officially released in Russia, which are in most cases fully dubbed with multiple voices and complete deletion of the original language, all of Puchkov's translations are single-voiced—both female and male voices are read by Puchkov himself and issued as voiceover, allowing the original soundtrack to be heard. Puchkov contends that this provides a more authentic product, closer to what the director originally intended. Puchkov's works feature an approach in which every line is translated properly and never deleted, and in which the style of language and speech is made as close to an original as possible. Word play and other figures of speech are translated to appropriate forms found in Russian.

Another important highlight of Puchkov's work is the translation of English expletives to Russian expletives. Original dialogue containing words and expressions usually censored on American public television channels, are left intact in Puchkov's dialogue translations.

The official Russian dub of foreign films is commonly stripped of all profanities by the studios, a practice which not only waters down the director's vision but also confuses the audience, as colorful colloquial expressions are lost in the word-for-word translation, bearing little similarity with the original. Goblin's use of semantic translation prevents important plot points from becoming distorted, as villains unintentionally are transformed into comical characters when the official profanity free Russian dub fails to convey the original meaning.

There are several widely known funny examples of this softened translations, like this dialogue in Commando:
— Fuck you! Asshole! — Прощайся с жизнью! (Say "good bye" to your life!)
— Fuck YOU! Asshole! — Это ты прощайся с жизнью! (Say "good bye" to your life yourself!)

Commercial translations
Since film translation is a hobby for Puchkov, he translates only those films that he is interested in and does not receive any money for his translations. However, due to his popularity, he receives commercial offers from licensed foreign film distributors in Russia to translate films that are screened in theaters and aired on TV. The list of his commercial translations includes: Team America: World Police, South Park, The Sopranos, the funny translation of Bimmer produced in cooperation with the makers of the original, and others.

The latest work in this field is Guy Ritchie's RocknRolla. This time, distributors contracted Puchkov to do a translation for the dub, with himself voice-acting the narrator, Archy. At the premiere Puchkov himself read a non-censored, voiceover translation; in theaters, a somewhat milder version was shown.

Dmitry Buzadzhi, a Russian language translator, does contend that the quality of Puchkov's own translations is rather mediocre, notwithstanding his supposedly thorough approach.

Humorous translations
Another important facet of his translation works are his so-called "funny translations", which are parodies of awkward translations presented at the Russian film market, where characters apparently speak quite differently from how they spoke in the original films. The discrepancy between "funny-translated" and original film creates a strong comic effect. Moreover, changing the names of characters, music, and adding new video and sound effects can turn a serious film into a true slapstick comedy. "Funny-translated" films often skewer prominent world and Russian events (including social and political life) and contain references to well-known American, Soviet and current Russian films. Puchkov's "funny translations" come with the logo of another of Puchkov's studios, Bozhya Iskra (God's Spark). All funny translations are made with the help of Puchkov's site visitors and their names appear at the end of the film in a cast section.

The Lord of the Rings translations were adapted by Goblin into two books containing much of the humor of the translated films. A video game, has also been developed by Gaijin Entertainment and published in Russia by 1C. The game allows the player to choose one of seven characters and play through 12 levels slashing through enemies equipped with weapons ranging from knives to flamethrowers.

Projects
On February 15, 2008, The Truth About 9th Company documentary video game was officially launched. Puchkov has proved himself as the ideological leader and inspirer of the development of this project, which was announced as the response to "the intentional destruction of historical memory of the people".

Ban on YouTube
On August 4, 2022, YouTube completely removed the channel of Dmitry Puchkov, notifying him of a violation of community rules.

Personal life
Puchkov was brought up in the family of an army officer who traveled a great deal around the country. He studied at six different schools, including a boarding school, and finished his 10th grade in the German Democratic Republic. He served in the army, where he was employed as a military driver and operated a truck; he also received basic tank driver training. He retired from his work in the Militsiya in 1998 after working there for 6 years.

He has also worked as a librarian, truck driver, air compressor operator, automobile mechanic, plumber, driller assistant, electrician, polisher, turner, metal smith, cab driver, masseur, police canine handler, criminal investigator and sales manager.

See also
Gavrilov translation

References

Further reading

External links
Tynu40k Goblina 
The full list of translations made by Puchkov 
Dungeon Cleaners official site 
The Fellas and the Ring game official site 
The Union of Orthodox citizens proposes the fundraising for the funny translation of The Da Vinci Code 
A collection of Puchkov's quotes sorted by categories 
About Goblin  

1961 births
Living people
20th-century atheists
20th-century Russian writers
21st-century atheists
21st-century Russian writers
English–Russian translators
Writers from Kropyvnytskyi
Russian atheism activists
Russian people of German descent
Russian male video game actors
Russian male voice actors
Russian male writers
Russian people of Ukrainian descent
Russian police officers
Russian YouTubers
Writers from Saint Petersburg
Russian individuals subject to European Union sanctions